Bob Bertles is an Australian jazz alto, tenor and baritone saxophonist and bandleader.

Life and career
A self-taught musician, Bertles in the late 1950s and early 60s was a member of the developing modern jazz scene that grew out of venues like the Mocambo in Newtown and the El Rocco Jazz Cellar in Sydney's Kings Cross.

Active in clubs, on TV, as a session musician and on the pop-rock scene, he toured with Johnny O'Keefe.

In 1967 Bertles temporarily joined Sydney-based rock-soul band Max Merritt & The Meteors. Only weeks after joining, Bertles, Merritt and drummer Stewie Speer narrowly escaped death after their van collided head-on with a truck on the way to a country dance; all three were seriously injured and Bertles was left with a permanent limp. In 1974, after the group split, Bertles joined Ian Carr's Nucleus.

In more recent years Bertles has toured Europe extensively, joined the orchestra for the Australian production of the stage musical Chicago, where he met his future wife, theatre performer Nancye Hayes.

In addition to regular concerts, festivals, session work, and touring, Bertles' recent projects include recording and live performances with Sydney's renowned Ten Part Invention.

Discography

Albums

Awards and nominations

ARIA Music Awards
The ARIA Music Awards is an annual awards ceremony that recognises excellence, innovation, and achievement across all genres of Australian music. They commenced in 1987. 

! 
|-
| 1996
| Rhythm of the Heart
| Best Jazz Album
| 
| 
|-

References

Australian jazz saxophonists
Male saxophonists
Jazz tenor saxophonists
Living people
Nucleus (band) members
21st-century saxophonists
Year of birth missing (living people)
21st-century Australian male musicians
21st-century Australian musicians
Male jazz musicians